The 1991 All-Ireland Senior Football Championship Final was the 104th All-Ireland Final and the deciding match of the 1991 All-Ireland Senior Football Championship, an inter-county Gaelic football tournament for the top teams in Ireland. 

Meath had beaten Dublin in the famous four-game saga, but Down stormed into an 11-point lead and Meath's rally was too little, too late.

This was Down's fourth appearance in an All-Ireland final, and their fourth win from four.

Match

Details

References

External links
 All-Ireland final 1991: Down's knickerbocker glory

All-Ireland Senior Football Championship Final
All
All-Ireland Senior Football Championship Final, 1991
All-Ireland Senior Football Championship Finals
All-Ireland Senior Football Championship Finals
Down county football team matches
Meath county football team matches